Vistula Spit Landscape Park (Park Krajobrazowy Mierzeja Wiślana) is a protected area (Landscape Park) on the Vistula Spit in northern Poland.

The Park lies within Pomeranian Voivodeship, in Nowy Dwór Gdański County (Krynica Morska, Gmina Sztutowo).

Within the Landscape Park are two nature reserves.

The park is included in the Natura 2000 network (entirely in the habitat area and partly in the bird one) and in the HELCOM Marine Protected Areas Baltic System of Protected Areas as MPA No. 85 Vistula Lagoon and Mierzeja Wislana.

References 

Vistula Spit
Parks in Pomeranian Voivodeship